The Oaks Club Challenger (previously known as Wilde Lexus Women's USTA Pro Circuit Event) is a tournament for professional female tennis players played on outdoor clay courts. The event is classified as a $25,000 ITF Women's Circuit tournament and has been held in Osprey, Florida, United States, since 2009.

Past finals

Singles

Doubles

External links 
 ITF search
 Website

ITF Women's World Tennis Tour
Clay court tennis tournaments
Recurring sporting events established in 2009
Tennis tournaments in Florida
2009 establishments in Florida
Sports in Sarasota County, Florida